Desert Lights is the fifth studio album by Australian band, Something for Kate, released on 1 June 2006. The album peaked at No.1 on the ARIA Charts.

Track listing
(All songs by Something for Kate except where noted)
"California" – 3:42
"Down the Garden Path" – 4:54
"Cigarettes and Suitcases" – 4:04
"This Is the Life for Me" – 3:59
"A Fool's History Pt.1" – 3:37
"Oh Kamikaze" – 3:55
"Impossible" – 4:58
"Transparanoia" – 4:53
"Statues" – 4:13
"Washed out to Sea" – 5:07

Bonus Bootleg Disc
(from the limited edition 2 CD version)
"Three Dimensions" (Live at the Zoo)
"Hawaiian Robots" (Live at the Zoo)
"Prick" (Live at the Zoo)
"Pinstripe" (Live at the Zoo)
"Déjà Vu" (Live at the Zoo)
"Born to Run" (originally recorded by Bruce Springsteen)

Live tracks are taken from two concerts at live music venue, The Zoo, in Fortitude Valley, Brisbane, on 20 and 21 May 2006.

Deluxe edition bonus disc 
The 2014 deluxe edition included a bonus disc of the album's B-sides.

Track listing
"Three Dimensions (Live at the Zoo)" - 3:44
"Hawaiian Robots (Live at the Zoo)" - 5:04
"Prick (Live at the Zoo)" - 3:55
"Pinstripe (Live at the Zoo)" - 5:55
"Déjà vu (Live at the Zoo)" - 4:49
"Born to Run" (Bruce Springsteen) - 4:33
"The Actor Makes His Move" - 3:39
"The Killing Moon" (Will Sergeant, Ian McCulloch, Les Pattinson, Pete de Freitas) - 4:25
"Prick (Live at the POW)" - 3:59
"Airport Kid" - 4:07
"The Amazing Machine that Does Not Work - Demo version" - 4:34
"Close to Me" (Robert Smith) - 3:43
"Cassandra Walks the Plank" - 3:01
"Rock the Casbah" (Topper Headon, Joe Strummer, Mick Jones) - 3:49
"Oh Kamikaze (T-Rek Remix)" - 7:44
"The Futurist" - 4:05

Charts

Certifications

Personnel
Something for Kate
Paul Dempsey – guitar, vocals
Clint Hyndman – drums, percussion, backing vocals
Stephanie Ashworth – bass guitar, backing vocals

Additional personnel
Mike Garson – piano on "Washed Out To Sea"
Pete Yorn – backing vocals on "California"
Brad Wood – backing vocals
Jaye Ellah – backing vocals
Chick Molverton – backing vocals

Release history

References

2006 albums
Something for Kate albums
Murmur (record label) albums
Albums produced by Brad Wood